Airmont may refer to:

 Airmont, New York, a village in Rockland County, New York, US
 Airmont, Virginia, an unincorporated village in Loudoun County, Virginia, US
 Airmont (microarchitecture), used in Intel Atom processors